Seis días para morir ("Six Days to Die") is a 1967 Mexican film. It stars Sara García.

External links
 

1967 films
Mexican mystery thriller films
1960s Spanish-language films
1960s Mexican films